The Journal of Men's Studies (abbreviated JMS) is a peer-reviewed journal established in 1992 as the first  published by Men's Studies Press. As of 2015 the journal is published by SAGE Publications.

See also 
 Gender studies
 Men's studies
 Women's studies

External links 
 

Sociology journals
Publications established in 1992
Men's studies journals
1992 establishments in the United States
Triannual journals